Rodrigo Andrés Ramírez Miranda (born 15 February 1982) is a former Chilean footballer. 

He played as a defender with O'Higgins in the Primera División de Chile using the No. 7 jersey. His speed and technique at right wing has earned him the nickname Garrincha.

External links
 
 

Chilean footballers
Living people
1982 births
Deportes Concepción (Chile) footballers
O'Higgins F.C. footballers
Everton de Viña del Mar footballers
Association football defenders
People from Rancagua